The Rikidozan Memorial Show was a professional wrestling event held in 1996, and again in 2000, as a tribute to "the father of puroresu," Rikidozan (also known as Mitsuhiro Momota). Both shows were considered major events in Japan and had involvement from virtually every major wrestling promotion at the time. The first show was held in Yokohama, Japan at the Yokohama Arena on June 30, 1996, with 16,000 in attendance. The show featured interpromotional matches of wrestlers from All Japan Pro Wrestling, Big Japan Pro Wrestling, Frontier Martial-Arts Wrestling, IWA Kakutoshijuku, International Wrestling Association, Japan Pro Shooting, Kitao Dojo, Michinoku Pro, New Japan Pro-Wrestling, Professional Wrestling Fujiwara Gumi, Samurai Project, UWFi, Wrestle Association R and joshi promotions GAEA Japan, JWP Joshi Puroresu and Ladies Legend Pro-Wrestling. In the main event, Genichiro Tenryu  and Tatsumi Fujinami  defeated Koki Kitihara  and Riki Choshu  in a tag team match. On the undercard, Keiji Mutoh & Kensuke Sasaki defeated Shinya Hashimoto & Junji Hirata and a "PWFG vs. UWFI" match between Yoshiaki Fujiwara and Yoji Anjoh resulted in a double-countout.

One of the largest wrestling events of the decade, the first show received some criticism for restricting FMW wrestlers to traditional puroresu as "garbage wrestling" was prohibited. Of the 15 promotions that participated, a noticeable gap between mainstream and independent promotions was also apparent.

A second show was held four years later on March 11, 2000, again held in the Yokohama Arena,  and attended by between 13,000 and 9,000 fans. The promotions involved included Battlarts, Big Japan Pro Wrestling, Frontier Martial-Arts Wrestling, Go Gudan, Michinoku Pro, New Japan Pro-Wrestling, Pancrase, Takada Dojo, Toryumon, Universal Fighting Arts Organization, WAR and joshi promotions All Japan Women's Pro-Wrestling, JWP Project and Neo Japan Ladies Pro-Wrestling. Genichiro Tenryu  & BB Jones defeated Shinya Hashimoto  & Naoya Ogawa  in the main event. The undercard matches included Yoji Anjoh defeating Tarzan Goto as well as a tag team match which saw Team Big Japan (Ryuji Yamikawa & Tomoaki Honma) defeat Team FMW (Naoki Yamazaki & H). Also on the card was a celebrity "exhibition" match which saw Japanese pop star Hideaki Takizawa pin Antonio Inoki. Both the first and second memorial shows were released on VHS in 2000 and on DVD in 2004, the latter as part of a 6-part collection entitled Rikidozan - Puro Founder.

A third show was held by Mitsuharu Misawa and Pro Wrestling Noah at Korakuen Hall on December 11, 2003. The event was headlined by Rikidozan's son, Mitsuo Momota, who teamed with Tsuyoshi Kikuchi against KENTA and Naomichi Marufuji for the Global Honoured Champions Tag Team Championship.

Show results

1996 Rikidozan Memorial Show
June 30, 1996 in Yokohama, Japan (Yokohama Arena)

2000 Rikidozan Memorial Show
March 11, 2000 in Yokohama, Japan (Yokohama Arena)

References

Professional wrestling memorial shows
1996 in professional wrestling
2000 in professional wrestling
Events in Yokohama
Professional wrestling in Yokohama
June 1996 events in Asia
March 2000 events in Japan
1996 in Japan
2000 in Japan